Emil Gottlieb Schuback (28 June 1820, in Hamburg – 14 March 1902, in Düsseldorf) was a German genre painter and lithographer.

Biography 
At the age of sixteen, he went to Munich, where he studied with Peter von Cornelius and Heinrich Maria von Hess at the Academy of Fine Arts.

Working with Cornelius led him to become involved with the Nazarene movement so, in 1844, he went to Rome to join a group of like-minded German artists there; including Heinrich Dreber, Günther Gensler  and the sculptor, .

He returned to Hamburg in 1848, where he focused on genre and history painting. In 1855, he moved to Düsseldorf to polish his skills, working with the famous genre artist, Rudolf Jordan, and becoming associated with the Düsseldorfer Malerschule. After that, he devoted himself exclusively to genre works. Many featured scenes from the lives of children; reflecting his wife Emma's occupation as an elementary school teacher. Later, she would establish her own school for girls, the "Schuback’schen Schule". The school was in operation until 1911.

In 1885, he made another extended visit to Rome. A major retrospective was held at the Alte Kunsthalle shortly after his death.

References

Further reading 
 Dr. Hermann Alex. Müller: Biographisches Künstler-Lexikon, Verlag des Bibliographischen Instituts, Leipzig 1882.]
 Michael Thimann: "Emil Schuback (1820-1902) Zeichnungen eines Hamburger Deutschrömers". In: Nordelbingen, Vol.84, Heide 2015, pp. 131–164.

External links 

19th-century German painters
19th-century German male artists
German genre painters
German lithographers
Artists from Hamburg
Nazarene movement
1820 births
1902 deaths